Arvid Oskar Gustaf Genetz  (1 July 1848— 3 May 1915) was a Finnish politician, poet and linguist. He wrote under the pseudonym   Arvi Jännes.  His best known poems are "Herää Suomi”, ”Karjala” and ”Väinölän lapset”. He was a member of the Senate of Finland from 1901 to 1905.

Background
He was born in Impilahti, Finland. 
His parents were Carl Johan Garbriel Genetz and Laura Charlotta Ferrin.
His brother was the Finnish composer Emil Genetz (1852-1930).

Genetz was married in 1877 with Julia Eva Maria Arppe (1851-1931). He and his wife had six children: sons Juho, Arvi, Niilo and Paavo, and daughters Laura and Helvi. Poet and author Saima Harmaja  (1913–1937) was his granddaughter.

Career
Genetz graduated from the gymnasium in 1866, graduated from the Imperial Alexander University (now University of Helsinki) as a candidate doctor in 1871 and received his doctorate in 1877. He initially worked as a Finnish and Swedish teacher at the Lyceum in Hämeenlinna, and then serves as a lecturer at the University of Helsinki in the School of Finnish language and literature, in 1877. Genetz rival for this position was his colleague Eemil Nestor Setälä (1864–1935). A year later that the position was split in two—Finnish language and literature, and separately Finno-Ugric language research studies. The latter was the specialty of Genetz, and Setälä became the professor of Finnish language and literature. Genetz worked as a professor until 1901. He died during 1915 in Helsinki.

Genetz has been considered a pioneer of modern morphology, as he described the Sami morphological variations in a modern way, using principles later employed in generative linguistics to understand both the deep and surface structure of the language, separating the description of the models. In historical linguistics, he was the first one who realized that the Sami exchanged many loans words with the Baltic Finnish languages. In order to investigate Finno languages, Genetz made several expeditions to the White Sea region of Karelia the Kola Peninsula and Siberia.

Arvid Genetz worked with native speakers to translate the Gospel of Matthew into Karelian Sámi. In 1897 the British and Foreign Bible Society published his Gospel in 1897.  Chapters 1-22 were in Kildin Sámi language and chapters 23-28 were in  Akkala Sámi language.

Poetry
 Muistoja ja toiveita ystäville jouluksi (Weilin & Göös 1889)
 Muutamia Arvi Jänneksen runoja (Kansanvalistus-seura 1892)
 Toukokuun-lauluja (KS 1897)

References

External links
 
 
 Arvid Genetz at 375 Humanists. 22.6.2015.

1848 births
1915 deaths
People from Pitkyarantsky District
People from Viipuri Province (Grand Duchy of Finland)
Finnish Party politicians
Finnish senators
Members of the Diet of Finland
19th-century Finnish poets
Linguists from Finland
Finnish Finno-Ugrists
Finnish male poets
19th-century male writers
University of Helsinki alumni
Academic staff of the University of Helsinki